Andrea Senteler (born 28 April 1977) is a Swiss former cross-country skier. She competed in the women's 5 kilometre classical at the 1998 Winter Olympics.

Cross-country skiing results
All results are sourced from the International Ski Federation (FIS).

Olympic Games

World Championships

World Cup

Season standings

References

External links
 

1977 births
Living people
Swiss female cross-country skiers
Olympic cross-country skiers of Switzerland
Cross-country skiers at the 1998 Winter Olympics
People from Davos
Sportspeople from Graubünden
20th-century Swiss women